Elections to Knowsley Metropolitan Borough Council were held on 10 June 2004.  The whole council was up for election with boundary changes since the last election in 2003 reducing the number of councillors by three. The Labour Party kept overall control of the council.  Overall turnout was 33.7%.

Election result

6 Labour councillors were uncontested.

Ward results

References

2004
2004 English local elections
2000s in Merseyside